In calculus, integration by substitution, also known as u-substitution, reverse chain rule or change of variables, is a method for evaluating integrals and antiderivatives. It is the counterpart to the chain rule for differentiation, and can loosely be thought of as using the chain rule "backwards".

Substitution for a single variable

Introduction 
Before stating the result rigorously, consider a simple case using indefinite integrals.

Compute .

Set . This means , or in differential form, .  Now 

where  is an arbitrary constant of integration.

This procedure is frequently used, but not all integrals are of a form that permits its use. In any event, the result should be verified by differentiating and comparing to the original integrand.

For definite integrals, the limits of integration must also be adjusted, but the procedure is mostly the same.

Definite integrals 
Let  be a differentiable function with a continuous derivative, where  is an interval. Suppose that  is a continuous function. Then

In Leibniz notation, the substitution  yields 

Working heuristically with infinitesimals yields the equation

which suggests the substitution formula above.  (This equation may be put on a rigorous foundation by interpreting it as a statement about differential forms.)  One may view the method of integration by substitution as a partial justification of Leibniz's notation for integrals and derivatives.

The formula is used to transform one integral into another integral that is easier to compute. Thus, the formula can be read from left to right or from right to left in order to simplify a given integral. When used in the former manner, it is sometimes known as u-substitution or w''-substitution in which a new variable is defined to be a function of the original variable found inside the composite function multiplied by the derivative of the inner function. The latter manner is commonly used in trigonometric substitution, replacing the original variable with a trigonometric function of a new variable and the original differential with the differential of the trigonometric function.

 Proof 

Integration by substitution can be derived from the fundamental theorem of calculus as follows. Hence the integrals

and

in fact exist, and it remains to show that they are equal.

Since  is continuous, it has an antiderivative . The composite function  is then defined. Since  is differentiable, combining the chain rule and the definition of an antiderivative gives

Applying the fundamental theorem of calculus twice gives

which is the substitution rule.

 Examples 

 Example 1 
Consider the integral

Make the substitution  to obtain , meaning .  Therefore,

Alternatively, one may fully evaluate the indefinite integral (see below) first then apply the boundary conditions. This becomes especially handy when multiple substitutions are used.

 Example 2 

For the integral

a variation of the above procedure is needed. The substitution  implying  is useful because . We thus have

The resulting integral can be computed using integration by parts or a double angle formula, followed by one more substitution.

Antiderivatives

Substitution can be used to determine antiderivatives.

Similar to example 1 above, the following antiderivative can be obtained with this method:

where  is an arbitrary constant of integration.

There were no integral boundaries to transform, but in the last step reverting the original substitution  was necessary. When evaluating definite integrals by substitution, one may calculate the antiderivative fully first, then apply the boundary conditions. In that case, there is no need to transform the boundary terms.

The tangent function can be integrated using substitution by expressing it in terms of the sine and cosine:

Using the substitution  gives  and

 Substitution for multiple variables 

One may also use substitution when integrating functions of several variables. 
Here the substitution function  needs to be injective and continuously differentiable, and the differentials transform as

This formula expresses the fact that the absolute value of the determinant of a matrix equals the volume of the parallelotope spanned by its columns or rows.

More precisely, the change of variables'' formula is stated in the next theorem:

Theorem.

The conditions on the theorem can be weakened in various ways.  First, the requirement that  be continuously differentiable can be replaced by the weaker assumption that  be merely differentiable and have a continuous inverse. This is guaranteed to hold if  is continuously differentiable by the inverse function theorem.  Alternatively, the requirement that  can be eliminated by applying Sard's theorem.

For Lebesgue measurable functions, the theorem can be stated in the following form:

Theorem.

in the sense that if either integral exists (including the possibility of being properly infinite), then so does the other one, and they have the same value.

Another very general version in measure theory is the following:

Theorem. Let  be a locally compact Hausdorff space equipped with a finite Radon measure , and let  be a σ-compact Hausdorff space with a σ-finite Radon measure . Let  be an absolutely continuous function (where the latter means that  whenever ).

Furthermore, it is possible to write

In geometric measure theory, integration by substitution is used with Lipschitz functions.  A bi-Lipschitz function is a Lipschitz function  which is injective and whose inverse function  is also Lipschitz.  By Rademacher's theorem a bi-Lipschitz mapping is differentiable almost everywhere.  In particular, the Jacobian determinant of a bi-Lipschitz mapping  is well-defined almost everywhere.  The following result then holds:

Theorem. Let  be measurable. Then

in the sense that if either integral exists (or is properly infinite), then so does the other one, and they have the same value.

The above theorem was first proposed by Euler when he developed the notion of double integrals in 1769. Although generalized to triple integrals by Lagrange in 1773, and used by Legendre, Laplace, Gauss, and first generalized to  variables by Mikhail Ostrogradski in 1836, it resisted a fully rigorous formal proof for a surprisingly long time, and was first satisfactorily resolved 125 years later, by Élie Cartan in a series of papers beginning in the mid-1890s.

Application in probability

Substitution can be used to answer the following important question in probability: given a random variable  with probability density  and another random variable  such that  for injective (one-to-one) , what is the probability density for ?

It is easiest to answer this question by first answering a slightly different question: what is the probability that  takes a value in some particular subset ?  Denote this probability .  Of course, if  has probability density  then the answer is

but this isn't really useful because we don't know ; it's what we're trying to find.

Changing from variable  to  gives

Combining this with our first equation gives

so

The result is

See also

Probability density function
Substitution of variables
Trigonometric substitution
Weierstrass substitution
Euler substitution
Glasser's master theorem
Pushforward measure

Notes

References

 .
 .
 
 .
 
 .

External links

 Integration by substitution at Encyclopedia of Mathematics
 Area formula at Encyclopedia of Mathematics

Articles containing proofs
Integral calculus

es:Métodos de integración#Método de integración por sustitución